Annah Raisibe Ntozakhe (born 29 November 1996) is a South African cricketer. She made her Women's One Day International (WODI) debut against India in the 2017 South Africa Quadrangular Series on 9 May 2017. She made her Women's Twenty20 International (WT20I) debut for South Africa Women against India on 13 February 2018.

In March 2018, she was one of fourteen players to be awarded a national contract by Cricket South Africa ahead of the 2018–19 season.

On 9 October 2018, she was named in South Africa's squad for the 2018 ICC Women's World Twenty20 tournament. However, later that same day the International Cricket Council (ICC) deemed her bowling action to be illegal. Therefore, she was immediately suspended from bowling in international matches. The following month, she was ruled out of the tournament and replaced by Yolani Fourie.

In September 2019, she was named in the F van der Merwe XI squad for the inaugural edition of the Women's T20 Super League in South Africa. On 23 July 2020, Ntozakhe was named in South Africa's 24-woman squad to begin training in Pretoria, ahead of their tour to England.

In February 2022, she was named as one of three reserves in South Africa's team for the 2022 Women's Cricket World Cup in New Zealand.

References

External links
 
 

1996 births
Living people
Cricketers from Johannesburg
South African women cricketers
South Africa women One Day International cricketers
South Africa women Twenty20 International cricketers
Central Gauteng women cricketers